Escola Suiço Brasileira de São Paulo is a Swiss international school in , São Paulo, Brazil. It serves Educação Infantil/Kindergarten through Ensino Médio/Gymnasialstufe.

 80% of the school's 740 students are Brazilians.

References

External links
 Escola Suiço Brasileira de São Paulo 
 Escola Suiço Brasileira de São Paulo 
 Schweizerschule São Paulo - EAD, Swiss National Library 

International schools in São Paulo
Sao Paulo